The  GER Class G15 was a class of ten 0-4-0T steam tram locomotives designed by Thomas William Worsdell for the Great Eastern Railway. They passed to the London and North Eastern Railway (LNER) at the 1923 grouping, and received the LNER classification Y6.

Overview
These locomotives had  inside cylinders driving  wheels. They were used on the Wisbech and Upwell Tramway in East Anglia. They were later used elsewhere after being replaced by the more powerful GER Class C53 (LNER Class J70) 0-6-0Ts.

Four were withdrawn before the grouping – 131 in 1907, 130 in 1909, 127 and 128 in 1913. Sometime before 1921, numbers 125, 126 and 129 were placed on the duplicate list, and had their numbers prefixed with a "0" (The original numbers were reused on the 1921-batch of class C53 locomotives). Four more were withdrawn before the 1944 renumbering — 7132 in 1931, 07129 in 1933, 07125 and 07126 in 1943. The remaining two were numbered 8082 (ex-7133) and 8083 (ex-7134). Both survived into British Railways ownership in 1948 and they were numbered 68082 and 68083. The former was withdrawn in 1951, and the latter in 1952. None has been preserved, although 68083 had been earmarked for preservation, although it was scrapped after standing in Stratford paintshop for over a year.

The Nene Valley Railway were building a replica of the Y6 class to perform as Toby the Tram Engine for their Day Out with Thomas events. However, when the Rev. W. Awdry died in 1997, the project was ceased halfway through.

References

Notes

Bibliography

External links 
 G15 Class 0-4-0T 1883-1897 — Great Eastern Railway Society
 The Y6 (GER G15) 0-4-0 Tram Engines — LNER Encyclopedia

G15
0-4-0T locomotives
Railway locomotives introduced in 1883
Tram engines
Scrapped locomotives
Standard gauge steam locomotives of Great Britain